Genomics is a peer-reviewed scientific journal in genomics, publishing articles on topics such as comparative genomics, functional genomics, association studies, regulatory DNA elements, and genetics on a genome-wide scale. The journal was established in September 1987.

Abstracting and indexing
The journal is abstracted and indexed in:

References

External links

Genetics journals
Academic Press academic journals
Publications established in 1987
Genomics journals